Bärbel Mohr (5 July 1964 – 29 October 2010) was a German author. Since 1998 she published 20 German books (self-help books, children books, stories) – including the best-selling Bestellungen beim Universum (The Cosmic Ordering Service), translated into 14 languages so far and a German audio edition – which combined have more than 1.5 million copies in print.

Biography
Bärbel Mohr was born 5 July 1964. In 1995, she wrote The Cosmic Ordering Service for a small group of people and distributed it as a Xerox copy. In 2006, the British television presenter Noel Edmonds credited her book with turning his life and career around. Mohr regularly gave lectures and workshops on joyful living and how to realise your dreams. 

She lived near Munich with her family (husband and twins). She died there in 2010, aged 46.

Works
The Cosmic Ordering Service, Hodder Mobius, 2006. 
Cosmic Ordering for Beginners, Hay House. 
Cosmic Ordering: The Next Adventure, Hodder Mobius, 2007. 
The Cosmic Ordering Wish Book, Hay House, 2008. 
Instant Cosmic Ordering, Hay House, 2008. 
 COSMIC ORDERING: Complaints to the Universe ( - publishing April 8)
"The Miracle of Self-Love: The Secret Key to Open All Doors", Hay House, 2012,

See also

 Napoleon Hill
 Reverend Ike
 Kenneth Copeland
 Bob Tilton
 Jim Bakker

References

External links
  - Blog, Dates, Books
  - Bärbel Mohr Academy - Under construction (20-01-2014)

1964 births
2010 deaths
German women writers
Place of birth missing